Linear expansions in a single basis, whether it is a Fourier series, wavelet, or any other basis, are not suitable enough. A Fourier basis provided a poor representation of functions well localized in time, and wavelet bases are not well adapted to represent functions whose Fourier transforms have a narrow high frequency support. In both cases, it is difficult to detect and identify the signal patterns from their expansion coefficients, because the information is diluted across the whole basis. Therefore, we must use large amounts of Fourier basis or Wavelets to represent whole signal with small approximation error. Some matching pursuit algorithms are proposed in reference papers to minimize approximation error when given the amount of basis.

Properties
For Fourier series

 

Some time-frequency analysis are also attempt to represent signal as the form below

when given the amount of basis M, minimize approximation error in mean-square sense

Examples

Three-parameter atoms

Since  are not orthogonal, should be determined by a matching pursuit process.

Three parameters:

  controls the central time.

  controls the central frequency.

  controls the scaling factor.

Four-parameter atoms (chirplet)

Four parameters:

  controls the central time

  controls the central frequency

  controls the scaling factor

  controls the chirp rate

Short-time Fourier transform of different basis

References
S. G. Mallat and Z. Zhang, “Matching pursuits with time-frequency dictionaries,” IEEE Trans. Signal Process., vol. 41, no. 12, pp. 3397–3415, Dec. 1993.
A. Bultan, “A four-parameter atomic decomposition of chirplets,” IEEE Trans. Signal Process., vol. 47, no. 3, pp. 731–745, Mar. 1999.
C. Capus, and K. Brown. "Short-time fractional Fourier methods for the time-frequency representation of chirp signals," J. Acoust. Soc. Am. vol. 113, issue 6, pp. 3253–3263, 2003.
 Jian-Jiun Ding, Time frequency analysis and wavelet transform class note, Department of Electrical Engineering, National Taiwan University (NTU), Taipei, Taiwan, 2016

Time–frequency analysis